211th may refer to:

211th Battalion (American Legion), CEF, a unit in the Canadian Expeditionary Force during the First World War
211th Military Police Battalion, a unit of the Massachusetts Army National Guard 
211th Rescue Squadron, a unit of the Alaska Air National Guard that flies the HC-130 Hercules

See also
211th Street (Lincoln Highway) (Metra), a commuter rail station along the Main Branch of the Metra Electric line in Park Forest, Illinois
211 (number)
211, the year 211 (CCXI) of the Julian calendar